Palco High School is a public high school in Palco, Kansas, United States.  It is operated by Palco USD 269 school district, and serves the communities of Damar, Palco, and Zurich.  The school mascot is a rooster and the school colors are black and gold.  Palco High School is a relatively small and rural high school.

History
The Palco Roosters won the Kansas State High School boys class B Indoor Track & Field championship in 1962.

See also
 List of high schools in Kansas
 List of unified school districts in Kansas

References

External links
 USD 269 district website

Rooks County, Kansas
Public high schools in Kansas